Ricardo Silva Elizondo (6 February 1954 – 7 February 2021) was a Mexican singer and actor best known for his dubbing of American animated cartoons and Japanese anime into the Spanish language. His works include the Spanish Latin American version of the Dragon Ball Z theme, "Cha-La Head-Cha-La", and the second opening of Digimon. Aside from his dubbing and singing career, Silva has an extensive track record of participating in Mexican telenovelas such as El premio mayor, Amigas y rivales and Destilando amor. He has also participated in comic shows such as Al derecho y al derbez.

He died from COVID-19 in Mexico City during the COVID-19 pandemic in Mexico, one day after his 67th birthday.

References

External links
 Guadalupe Jimenez, "Piratería y descargas en línea afectan a la música," in Milenio
 
 

1954 births
2021 deaths
Mexican male voice actors
20th-century Mexican male actors
21st-century Mexican male actors
Mexican male singers
Mexican tenors
Male actors from Mexico City
Musicians from Mexico City
Deaths from the COVID-19 pandemic in Mexico